Jeffrey L. Gould is an American historian, currently the Distinguished Professor at Indiana University.

References

Year of birth missing (living people)
Living people
Indiana University faculty
21st-century American historians
American male non-fiction writers
Yale University alumni
21st-century American male writers